Exomella is a genus of pill beetles in the family Byrrhidae. There are at least 2 described species in Exomella.

Species
 Exomella merickeli Johnson, 1985
 Exomella pleuralis (Casey, 1908)

References

 Johnson, Paul J. (1991). "Taxonomic notes, new records, and a key to the adults of North American Byrrhidae (Coleoptera)". Proceedings of the Entomological Society of Washington, vol. 93, no. 2, 322–332.
 Johnson, Paul J. / Arnett, Ross H. Jr., Michael C. Thomas, Paul E. Skelley, and J. H. Frank, eds. (2002). "Family 42. Byrrhidae Latreille 1804". American Beetles, vol. 2: Polyphaga: Scarabaeoidea through Curculionoidea, 113–116.

Further reading

 Arnett, R.H. Jr., M. C. Thomas, P. E. Skelley and J. H. Frank. (eds.). (2002). American Beetles, Volume II: Polyphaga: Scarabaeoidea through Curculionoidea. CRC Press LLC, Boca Raton, FL.
 
 Richard E. White. (1983). Peterson Field Guides: Beetles. Houghton Mifflin Company.

Byrrhidae